Félix Raúl Décima  (born 7 September 1979 in Ezeiza) is a retired Argentine football midfielder.

See also
Football in Argentina
List of football clubs in Argentina

References

External links
 Argentine Primera statistics  

1979 births
Living people
Sportspeople from Buenos Aires Province
Argentine footballers
Association football midfielders
Ferro Carril Oeste footballers
San Martín de San Juan footballers
Club Atlético Brown footballers
San Martín de Tucumán footballers
Deportivo Español footballers
Atlético Policial players
Argentine Primera División players
Primera Nacional players
Primera C Metropolitana players
Torneo Argentino B players